Hélène Frappat (2 September 1969 in Paris) is a French writer, translator and critic of cinema.

Biography 
A former student of the École Normale Supérieure (class 1989), she holds an agrégation of philosophy and a ph.d in letters. She is the author of numerous translations, including The Origins of Totalitarianism by Hannah Arendt, Études sur la personnalité autoritaire by Theodor W. Adorno, Amitié by Samson Raphaelson). On France Culture, she produced the monthly cinema magazine "Rien à voir", from 2004 to 2009, as well as numerous documentaries.

She is the author of nine novels published by Éditions Allia and Actes Sud. She has been translating the novels of Ann Patchett as well as Laura Lippman’s since 2019. 

In 2016, she participated in the Assises Internationales du Roman in Lyon.

Her last novel, Trois femmes disparaissent, is based upon the lives of Tippi Hedren, her daughter Melanie Griffith and her granddaughter Dakota Johnson. The novel has met critical acclaim and is currently being adapted by the IRCAM.

Bibliography 
Novels
2004: Sous réserve, Paris, Éditions Allia, 124 p. .
2007:  L'Agent de liaison, Paris, Éditions Allia, 142 p. .
2009: Par effraction, Paris, Éditions Allia, 128 p. 
 – Prix Wepler-Fondation La Poste – Mention Spéciale, 2009.
2011:  Inverno, Arles, France, Éditions Actes Sud, series "Un endroit où aller", 140 p. . then Actes Sud, series "Babel", 2016  Lady Hunt, Arles, France, Éditions Actes Sud, series "Domaine français", 2013, 320 p. , then Actes Sud, series "Babel", 2016 .
 – Sélection Prix Mauvais genres 2013.
 – Sélection Franz-Hessel-Preis 2014.
2014: N'oublie pas de respirer, Arles, France, Éditions Actes Sud, series "Essence", 64 p. 
 – Sélection Franz-Hessel-Preis 2015.
 – Sélection Prix des lycéens et apprentis de l'Ile de France

 2019: Le Dernier Fleuve, Actes Sud
 2021: Le Mont Fuji n’existe pas, Actes Sud
 2023: Trois femmes disparaissent, Actes Sud

Essays
2000: La Violence, Paris, Flammarion, series "Corpus", 251 p. 
2001: Jacques Rivette, secret compris, Paris, Cahiers du cinéma, 255 p. .
2008: Roberto Rossellini, Paris, Cahiers du cinéma, 94 p. 
 Trois films fantômes de Jacques Rivette, Paris, Cahiers du cinéma, 2002, 110 p. .

 References 

 External links 
 Hélène Frappat on France Inter
 Hélène Frappat on France Culture
 Hélène Frappat on Actes Sud
 Hélène Frappat on Babelio
 Hélène Frappat on MEL
 Hélène Frappat articles  on Les Inrockuptibles''
 Conférence d'Hélène Frappat Autour de Jacques Rivette on YouTube 
 Hélène Frappat: C'est une femme qui monte dans un train... on YouTube 

20th-century French women writers
20th-century French non-fiction writers
French film critics
French women critics
French women film critics
Writers from Paris
École Normale Supérieure alumni
1969 births
Living people